Roberto Breppe (born 4 February 1941) is a former Argentine cyclist. He competed at the 1964, 1968 and 1972 Summer Olympics.

References

External links
 

1941 births
Living people
Argentine male cyclists
Olympic cyclists of Argentina
Cyclists at the 1964 Summer Olympics
Cyclists at the 1968 Summer Olympics
Cyclists at the 1972 Summer Olympics
People from Paraná, Entre Ríos
Sportspeople from Entre Ríos Province